Jenny Weleminsky (née Elbogen; 12 June 1882 4 February 1957) was a German-speaking Esperantist and translator who was born in Thalheim, Lower Austria and brought up there and in Vienna. Some of her translations of works by Franz Grillparzer and other notable Austrian writers were published in the literary magazine  Literatura Mondo (Literary World), which became home to an influential group of authors collectively known as  Budapeŝto skolo, the Budapest school of Esperanto literature.

Early life and education
Jenny Elbogen was born into a Jewish family on 12 June 1882 at Schloss Thalheim, Lower Austria, the youngest child of Guido Elbogen (1845, Jungbrunzlau1918, Schloss Thalheim) who became President of the Anglo-Austrian Bank in Vienna, and his wife Rosalie (Ali) (née Schwabacher; 1850, Paris 1940, Sartrouville, Île-de-France), whom he married in 1868 in Paris. She had two sisters (Antoinette (1871–1901) and Helene (1878–1882), who died in infancy); and a brother (Heinrich, also known as Henri; 1872–1927).

Jenny Elbogen was educated at home by a Miss Allen, a governess from Devon, England. She became sufficiently fluent in English to translate Axel Munthe's memoir The Story of San Michele from English to Esperanto for publication in 1935.

Political views
Politically she had very determinate and fixed views, many inherited from her father. Jenny Elbogen was an ardent Habsburg monarchist and wished to see the Habsburg heir, Otto von Habsburg, restored to the Austrian throne after the Second World War. However, she was also an internationalist, as demonstrated by her enthusiasm for Esperanto. She opposed the Zionist movement's call for the establishment of a homeland for the Jewish people and ceased all contact with two of her daughters after they left Austria to live in Mandatory Palestine.

Her father Guido Elbogen had donated money towards the construction of a new synagogue (built in 1913) in Sankt Pölten.

Marriage and family life
After Guido Elbogen died in 1918 Jenny inherited Schloss Thalheim; her father had bought it in 1882 just before she was born. She lived there and in Prague (which until 1918 was part of Austria-Hungary) with her husband Friedrich ("Fritz") Weleminsky (1868, Golčův Jeníkov1945, London); they married at Schloss Thalheim on 4 December 1905. He was a lecturer in Hygiene (now called Microbiology) at the German University, Prague and developed tuberculomucin Weleminsky, a treatment for tuberculosis. The couple ran Schloss Thalheim as model dairy farm.

Facing Nazi persecution for being Jewish, they found sanctuary in 1939 in the United Kingdom where she continued to translate books into Esperanto, wrote poetry and taught English to other refugees.

After the Second World War and the death of her husband, Jenny Weleminsky spent several years in Vienna, returning eventually to London, where she died of breast cancer on 4 February 1957, aged 74.

She and her husband had four children together. Two of their daughters emigrated in the early 1930s to Mandatory Palestine where they took new names – Eliesabeth (born 1909) became Jardenah, and Dorothea (born 1912) was known as Leah. Their eldest daughter, Marianne (born 1906), and their son, Anton (born 1908), moved to Britain just before the Second World War.

Publications

Translations from German

Novel
Alexander Roda Roda,

Play
 Franz Grillparzer, translated by Jenny Weleminsky. Sappho: tragedio en kvin aktoj, Vienna

Poetry
 Franz Grillparzer, translated by Jenny Weleminsky. Poemoj de Grillparzer (Poems of Grillparzer)
 Franz Grillparzer, translated by Jenny Weleminsky. "La ora felo: drama poemo en tri partoj"
 Franz Grillparzer, translated by Jenny Weleminsky. "La praavino: kvinakta tragedio", Vienna
 Franz Grillparzer, translated by Jenny Weleminsky. "La sonĝo kiel vivo: drama fabelo en kvar aktoj", Vienna
 Franz Grillparzer, translated by Jenny Weleminsky. "Hanibalo: fragmento el nefinita dramo", Vienna
 Franz Grillparzer: "Respondo", 
 Anastasius Grün: "La epitafo", translated 
 Friedrich Halm: "Kio estas amo?", translated  
Johann Gabriel Seidl: "La majstro kaj lia verko", translated

Translations from English

Novel
 Axel Munthe: Romano de San Michele (The Story of San Michele), translated by Jenny Weleminsky. Literatura Mondo, Budapest, 1935, 511pp.

Notes

References

1882 births
1957 deaths
20th-century Austrian poets
20th-century Austrian women writers
20th-century Austrian translators
Austrian Esperantists
Austrian Jews
Austrian translators
Austrian women poets
Deaths from breast cancer
Deaths from cancer in England
Elbogen family
English-Esperanto translators
Esperanto speaking Jews
German–Esperanto translators
Jewish emigrants from Austria to the United Kingdom after the Anschluss
Jewish poets
Jewish translators
Jewish women writers
People from Sankt Pölten-Land District
Translators of Axel Munthe
Translators of Franz Grillparzer
Writers from Vienna